The Vilayet of Konya was a first-level administrative division (vilayet) of the Ottoman Empire in Asia Minor which included the whole, or parts of, the ancient regions of Pamphylia, Pisidia, Phrygia, Lycaonia, Cilicia and Cappadocia.

Demographics
At the beginning of the 20th century, Konya Vilayet reportedly had an area of 91,620 km2, while the preliminary results of the first Ottoman census of 1885 (published in 1908) gave the population as 1,088,100. The accuracy of the population figures ranges from "approximate" to "merely conjectural" depending on the region from which they were gathered. As of 1920, less than 10% of the population was described as being Christian, with the majority of Christian populations by the sea.

History
It was formed in 1864 by adding to the old eyalet of Karaman the western half of Adana, and part of southeastern Anatolia.

Economy
The population was for the most part agricultural and pastoral. The only industries were carpetweaving and the manufacture of cotton and silk stuffs. There were mines of chrome, mercury, sulphur, cinnabar, argentiferous lead and rock salt. The principal exports were salt, minerals, opium, cotton, cereals, wool and livestock; and the imports cloth-goods, coffee, rice and petroleum. The vilayet was traversed by the Anatolian railway, and contained the railhead of the Ottoman line from Smyrna.

Governors
Ferid Pasha (until late 1902)
Biren Mahmud Tewfik Bey (Dec 1902 - ?)

Administrative divisions

Sanjaks of the Vilayet:
 Sanjak of Konya (Konya, Akşehir, Seydişehir, Ilgın, Bozkır, Karaman, Ereğli, Karapınar)
 Sanjak of Nigde (Niğde, Nevşehir, Ürgüp, Aksaray, Bor)
 Sanjak of Burdur (Isparta, Uluborlu, Eğirdir, Şarkikaraağaç, Yalvaç)
 Sanjak of Antalya (Teke) (Antalya, Elmalı, Alanya, Akseki, Kaş)
 Sanjak of Hamidabad

References

External links
 

 
Vilayets of the Ottoman Empire in Anatolia
States and territories established in 1867
History of Antalya Province
History of Burdur Province
History of Isparta Province
History of Konya Province
History of Niğde Province
1867 establishments in the Ottoman Empire
1923 disestablishments in the Ottoman Empire